John Bovingdon (1890–1973) was a modern dancer-turned-economic analyst who performed regularly at the Kings Road House of architect R.M. Schindler in Los Angeles in the 1920s. He studied economics at Harvard and graduated with high honors in 1915. After graduation, he moved to Japan and worked as a professor of economics at Keio University until 1920. He was fired from his post at the  Office of Economic Warfare in 1943 following "publication of assertions that Bovingdon used to be a ballet dancer and once had Communist associations."

Bovingdon founded a dance school with his wife, Jeanya Marling, later she married Soviet playwright Alexander Afinogenov.

References 

1890 births
1973 deaths
20th-century American economists
Modern dancers
American male dancers
Harvard University alumni
Academic staff of Keio University
20th-century American dancers